WCIG (97.7 FM) is a radio station broadcasting a Christian radio format. Licensed to Big Flats, New York, United States, the station is owned by Family Life Network.

History
The station was assigned the call letters WNBR on August 28, 1987. On March 1, 1989, the station changed its call sign to WGMM; on May 16, 2005, to WCBA-FM; and on July 26, 2005, to WENI-FM. The station swapped call signs with its South Waverly, Pennsylvania sister station on December 27, 2017, assuming the WENY-FM call sign.

On June 1, 2021, WENY-FM changed their format from adult contemporary to Family Life Network's Christian radio format, assuming the call sign WCIG on June 22, 2021.

Previous logo

References

External links

Radio stations established in 1992
1992 establishments in New York (state)
CIG